Charlotte Kight (born 8 June 1988 in Dannevirke, New Zealand) is a New Zealand netball player. Kight started in the National Bank Cup with the Western Flyers in 2005, under head coach Yvette McCausland-Durie. She played with the Flyers for two years, before moving to the Canterbury Flames for the final year of the competition in 2007. With the start of the ANZ Championship in 2008, she continued to play with the Canterbury franchise, which changed their name to the Canterbury Tactix.

At international level, Kight played with the New Zealand U21 team from 2006 to 2009. She was also selected for the senior national team, the Silver Ferns in 2009, although she was not capped. Charlotte is the sister of Blackstick Bridget Kight.

In 2012, she left the Tactix and signed with the Northern Mystics, in order to get more court time in the wing defence position. She has resigned for the 2013 season.

She headlined the 2012 Fight for Christchurch, fighting fellow netballer and ex-teammate Elizabeth Manu, a fight which she won.

References

External links
 2009 Silver Ferns profile
 2010 ANZ Championship profile

New Zealand netball players
Mainland Tactix players
1988 births
Living people
Sportspeople from Dannevirke
ANZ Championship players
Western Flyers players
Northern Mystics players
Canterbury Flames players
New Zealand international Fast5 players